Top Country Albums is a chart that ranks the top-performing country music albums in the United States, published by Billboard.  In 2011, 19 different albums topped the chart; placings were based on electronic point of sale data from retail outlets.

In the issue of Billboard dated January 1, Taylor Swift was at number one with Speak Now, the album's seventh week in the top spot.  Swift's album held the peak position for the first seven weeks of 2011 before being displaced by Jason Aldean's My Kinda Party.  The latter album was the year's longest-running chart-topper, spending 12 weeks atop the chart in five separate spells between February and July.  It was displaced from the top spot for the first time in the issue dated March 5 by Need You Now by the group Lady Antebellum, which returned to number one having already spent 29 weeks at the top of the chart the previous year.  The group was the only act to achieve more than one number one during 2011, as it returned to the top spot in October with Own the Night, which spent five non-consecutive weeks atop the chart before the end of the year and was the final chart-topper of 2011.

Half of the eighteen acts to top the chart in 2011 did so for the first time.  In March, Aaron Lewis topped the chart with his first solo release, which was recorded in the country genre in contrast to his previous role as the lead vocalist of the alternative metal band Staind.  In April, Alison Krauss & Union Station reached number one for the first time nearly 20 years after first entering the chart, and Ronnie Dunn achieved his first solo chart-topper two months later, following years of success as one half of the duo Brooks & Dunn.  In July Justin Moore gained his first number one, and in August and September four consecutive chart-toppers were by acts which had not previously reached the top spot: Eric Church, Luke Bryan, Pistol Annies (although one member of the group, Miranda Lambert, had previously achieved number ones as a solo artist), and Jake Owen.  Bryan, along with Jason Aldean, was associated with the so-called bro-country style, an emerging sub-genre which incorporated influences from rock music and hip hop and often featured lyrics relating to partying, attractive young women, and pick-up trucks.  The final artist to reach number one for the first time was Scotty McCreery, who had won the tenth season of the TV singing competition American Idol earlier in the year.  His album Clear as Day entered the chart at number one in the issue of Billboard dated October 22, and spent six weeks at number one before the end of the year in three separate spells.

Chart history

References

2011
United States Country Albums